East 79th may refer to:
 East 79th (RTA Blue and Green Line Rapid Transit station)
 East 79th (RTA Red Line Rapid Transit station)